Olivos metro station is a station of the Mexico City Metro in the colonias (neighborhoods) of Ampliación Los Olivos and Granjas San Jerónimo, in Tláhuac, Mexico City. It is an elevated station with two side platforms, served by Line 12 (the Golden Line), between Tezonco and Nopalera stations. The station's pictogram features an olive branch, as it references the area's reputation for olive oil production during the Colonial period. The station was opened on 30 October 2012, on the first day of service between Tláhuac and Mixcoac metro stations.

The facilities are accessible for people with disabilities as there are elevators, tactile pavings and braille signage plates and there is a bicycle parking station. In 2019, the station had an average daily ridership of 17,846 passengers, making it the seventh busiest station on the line. The station was closed for 20 months due to structural faults found in the line in 2014. In May 2021, a portion of the station's overhead track collapsed while a train was on it. The track fell onto cars and pedestrians below it, killing 26 and injuring 98.

Location
Olivos is a metro station along Tláhuac Avenue, located in the colonias (Mexican Spanish for "neighborhood") of Ampliación Los Olivos and Granjas San Jerónimo, in the Tláhuac borough, in southeastern Mexico City. Within the system, the station lies between Tezonco and Nopalera metro stations. The area is serviced by Route 162 of the Red de Transporte de Pasajeros network.

Exits
There are two exits:

North: Tláhuac Avenue (between Pino Driveway and Del Panal Street), Ampliación Los Olivos.
South: Tláhuac Avenue and Olivos Street, Granjas San Jerónimo.

History and construction

Line 12 of the Mexico City Metro was built by Empresas ICA, in association with Alstom Mexicana and Grupo Carso. The station was opened on 30 October 2012, on the first day of the Mixcoac–Tláhuac service. The facilities are accessible for people with disabilities as there are elevators, tactile pavings and braille signage plates and there is a bicycle parking station. The pictogram depicts an olive branch, as the area was known for olive oil production during the Colonial period. Originally, the station was projected to be named "Los Olivos".

Incidents

From 12 March 2014 to 29 November 2015, Olivos station was closed due to technical and structural faults in the stretch between Atlalilco and Tláhuac.

After the 19 September 2017 earthquake damaged Line 12 tracks, Olivos metro station was temporarily closed, but three days, later it was reopened and served as the provisional terminal station for one month. According to the official report provided by the Metro system, steel diaphragms were placed in the Tezonco–Olivos section, to provide further support as the beams and headers were affected by the earthquake. The Olivos–Nopalera overpass was secured as Column 69 had a flexo-compression failure at the lower end. To repair it, weight was released, epoxy resins were injected, additional reinforcement was placed, and the column was enlarged to its maximum stress zone.

On 3 May 2021, a section of the elevated line between Olivos and Tezonco metro stations collapsed as a train traversed it. 26 people died and 98 others were injured. After the 2017 earthquake, the Superior Auditor of the Federation (Auditoría Superior de la Federación) made observations of damage to the collapsed section that were not resolved.

Ridership
According to the data provided by the authorities, except for the years when Olivos metro station was closed for several months, commuters have averaged per year between 10,000 and 18,500 daily entrances. In 2019, before the impact of the COVID-19 pandemic on public transport, the station's ridership totaled 6,513,862 passengers, which represented an increase of 537,987 passengers compared to 2018. In the same year, Olivos was the 102nd busiest of the system's 195 stations, and it was the line's 7th busiest.

Notes

References

External links 
 
 

2012 establishments in Mexico
Accessible Mexico City Metro stations
Mexico City Metro Line 12 stations
Mexico City Metro stations in Tláhuac
Railway stations opened in 2012